Helge Gustaf Samuel Bäckander (13 October 1891 – 11 November 1958) was a Swedish gymnast who competed in the 1920 Summer Olympics. He was part of the Swedish team that won the gold medal in the Swedish system event. Bäckander was a military officer, and reached the rank of captain. He moved around Sweden as a gymnastics consultant, through Lidköping and Sundsvall, before settling in Helsingborg, where he died.

References

1891 births
1958 deaths
Swedish male artistic gymnasts
Gymnasts at the 1920 Summer Olympics
Olympic gymnasts of Sweden
Olympic gold medalists for Sweden
Olympic medalists in gymnastics
Medalists at the 1920 Summer Olympics
People from Lidköping Municipality
Sportspeople from Västra Götaland County
20th-century Swedish people